Fats Domino Rock and Rollin is a 1956 album by Fats Domino.

Reception
Bruce Eder of AllMusic gave the album 2.5 out of five stars, praising the album for "Fats' piano takes the spotlight on the rollicking 'Swanee River Hop', a genuine virtuoso performance at the ivories."

Track listing
All tracks composed by Dave Bartholomew and Fats Domino, except where indicated
"My Blue Heaven" (Walter Donaldson, George A. Whiting) – 2:07 		
"Swanee River Hop" – 2:47 	
"Second Line Jump" – 2:33 	
"Goodbye" – 2:14 	
"Careless Love" (W.C. Handy, Martha E. Koenig, Spencer Williams) – 2:16 	
"I Love Her" – 2:06 	
"I'm in Love Again" – 1:56 	
"When My Dreamboat Comes Home" (D. Andrew Franklin, Cliff Friend) – 2:19 	
"Are You Going My Way" – 2:40 	
"If You Need Me" – 2:03 	
"My Heart Is in Your Hands" – 2:42 	
"Fat's Frenzy" – 2:25

References

External links

1956 albums
Fats Domino albums
Imperial Records albums